Eadric, alternatively spelled Edric or Edrick, is a name of Anglo-Saxon or Jute origin and may refer to:

 Eadric of Kent (died c. 686), king of Kent from 685 to 686
 Eadric Streona (died 1017), ealdorman of Mercia under Æthelred II and Cnut
 Eadric the Wild, leader of resistance against the Norman Conquest between 1068 and 1070
 Edric Gifford, 3rd Baron Gifford (1849–1911), English recipient of the Victoria Cross
 Edric Bastyan (1903–1980), British governor of South Australia and Tasmania
 Edric Connor (1913–1968), American singer and actor
 Edrick Floreal (born 1966), Canadian athlete
 Edrick Lee (born 1992), Australian rugby league footballer

The name may also refer to the following fictional characters:

 Edric (Dune), a character from Frank Herbert's 1969 science fiction novel Dune Messiah
 Edrik (Dune), a character from the Brian Herbert and Kevin J. Anderson novels Hunters of Dune (2006) and Sandworms of Dune (2007)
 Edric Blight (The Owl House), a character from Dana Terrace's animated television series

See also
 Edrich